Donald Stoker may refer to:

 Don Stoker (1922–1985), English footballer
 Donald Stoker (historian), American military historian